The 2009–10 AL-Bank Ligaen season was the 53rd season of ice hockey in Denmark. Nine teams participated in the league, and SønderjyskE Ishockey won the championship.

Regular season

Playoffs

External links
HockeyArchives.info

Dan
2009 in Danish sport
2010 in Danish sport